Samuel Hutchinson was an Anglican bishop in Ireland.

Formerly Dean of Dromore and Archdeacon of Connor he was nominated Bishop of Killala and Achonry on 27 March 1759 and consecrated on 22 April that year. He died on 27 October 1780.

References

Deans of Dromore
Archdeacons of Connor
Bishops of Killala and Achonry
1780 deaths
Year of birth unknown